Sant Quirze Safaja is a municipality in the comarca of the Vallès Oriental in Catalonia, Spain. Since May 2015 it has been part of the new comarca of Moianès; previously it was in Vallès Oriental.

References

External links
 Government data pages 

Municipalities in Moianès